Garvie is a surname of Scottish origin. Notable people with the surname include:

 Bill Garvie (1910–1944), Australian rules footballer
 Eddie Garvie (1892–1915), Scottish footballer
 Elizabeth Garvie (b. 1957), English actress
 Lawrence Garvie (b. 1933), Canadian lawyer and politician
 Thomas Bowman Garvie (1859–1944), English artist
 Wayne Garvie (b. 1963), BBC Worldwide Managing Director
 William Garvie (1837–1872), Canadian lawyer, journalist and politician

Island
 Garvie Island (An Garbh-eilean), east of Cape Wrath in Scotland

See also
 Garvey

References

Surnames of Scottish origin